Berit Erbe (4 September 1923 – 13 May 2009) was a Danish-Norwegian actress and theatrical historian.

She was born in Oslo and died in Bergen. After her theatre education she worked at the Royal Danish Theatre in Copenhagen. She took a magister degree in theatre aesthetics and history in Copenhagen in 1959. She was hired as a lecturer at the University of Bergen in 1969, took the dr.philos. degree on a thesis about Bjørn Bjørnson in 1973, and served as a professor from 1975 to 1988.

Selected filmography
 The Crime of Tove Andersen (1953)

References

1923 births
2009 deaths
Norwegian people of Danish descent
Norwegian stage actresses
Historians of theatre
Academic staff of the University of Bergen